Grass Pond may refer to:

 Grass Pond (Stillwater Mountain, New York)
 Grass Pond (Thendara, New York)